The San Felipe Hills are a low mountain range in eastern San Diego County, southern California.

Geography
The range defines the eastern side of San Felipe Valley, with the Volcan Mountains defining the west side.

They run southwest of Ranchita, and northeast of Julian and the Iipay Nation of Santa Ysabel Reservation.

Ecology
The southern section is within Anza-Borrego Desert State Park and supports Colorado Desert habitats. The northern section supports chaparral habitats.

See also

References 

Mountain ranges of Southern California
Mountain ranges of San Diego County, California
Mountain ranges of the Colorado Desert
Anza-Borrego Desert State Park